This is a list of earthquakes in 1939. Only magnitude 6.0 or greater earthquakes appear on the list. Lower magnitude events are included if they have caused death, injury or damage. Events which occurred in remote areas will be excluded from the list as they wouldn't have generated significant media interest. All dates are listed according to UTC time. 1939 was one of the deadliest years for earthquakes with over 60,000 deaths. Two major events resulted in this being the case. In January, a quake struck Chile causing 30,000 deaths, and in December Turkey was shaken by a quake which left 32,700 dead. Several other events occurred in Japan, Peru, Turkey and Ghana which left some fatalities.

Overall

By death toll 

 Note: At least 10 casualties

By magnitude 

 Note: At least 7.0 magnitude

Notable events

January

February

March

April

May

June

July

August

September

October

November

December

References

1939
 
1939